USS Jeannette Skinner (ID-1321), sometimes spelled incorrectly as USS Jeanette Skinner, was a cargo ship that served in the United States Navy from 1918 to 1919.

Construction
Jeannette Skinner was laid down as the commercial cargo ship J. M. Fox at Seattle by the Skinner and Eddy Corporation. Before she was launched, the Norwegian shipping firm Knut Knutsen OAS bought her and renamed her Jeannette Skinner. She was launched on 30 June 1917.

Service history

1917-1918
Before she could be completed, Jeannette Skinner was commandeered for World War I service by the United States Shipping Board in August 1917. Completed in September 1917, she was placed in service for the next several months as a civilian cargo ship under Shipping Board control.

1918-1919
Jeannette Skinner was acquired by the U.S. Navy for World War I service on 12 April 1918, assigned naval registry Identification Number (Id. No.) 1321, and commissioned the same day as USS Jeannette Skinner.

Jeannette Skinner was assigned to the Naval Overseas Transportation Service to transport cargo from the United States to France. After loading a cargo of general United States Army supplies at Baltimore, Maryland, Jeannette Skinner departed New York City on 3 May 1918 with a convoy for Brest, France, where she arrived on 17 May 1918. Returning to New York in June, she loaded another U.S. Army cargo at Baltimore and delivered it at Brest and Bordeaux, France, in August 1918. Her third eastbound voyage took her from New York to La Pallice, France, and Bordeaux in September–October 1918.

While in the Gironde River in France on 27 November, 16 days after the end of the war, Jeannette Skinner was damaged in collision with the Japanese steamer Ceylon Maru. During her return voyage in December, she had to put in at Bermuda for fuel and, upon arrival at Baltimore, entered drydock to begin two months of repairs.

In March–April 1919 Jeannette Skinner carried a cargo of wheat, oats, and lard to Cette, France, via Gibraltar on behalf of the Southern Food Administration. Once again she had to refuel on her homeward voyage, this time in the Azores. She arrived at Baltimore on 2 June 1919.

Jeannette Skinner was decommissioned at Baltimore on 10 June 1919 and was returned to the Shipping Board the same day.

1919-1945
Once again SS Jeannette Skinner, the ship returned to commercial service. In 1937, the Shipping Board sold her to a British firm based in Shanghai, China. She was taken over by the British Ministry of War Transport for World War II service in August 1944, then transferred to the United States War Shipping Administration in December.

She was scrapped at Baltimore in August 1945.

Notes

References

Department of the Navy: Naval Historical Center Online Library of Selected Images:  Civilian Ships: S.S. Jeannette Skinner (American Freighter, 1917) Originally S.S. J. M. Fox. Served as USS Jeannette Skinner (ID # 1321) in 1918-1919.
NavSource Online: Section Patrol Craft Photo Archive: Jeanette Skinner (ID 1321)

World War I cargo ships of the United States
Ships built by Skinner & Eddy
1917 ships
Cargo ships of the United States Navy